Keith Sarovich (20 May 1915 – 23 November 1987) was an Australian cricketer. He played seven first-class cricket matches for Victoria in 1941.

See also
 List of Victoria first-class cricketers

References

External links
 

1915 births
1987 deaths
Australian cricketers
Victoria cricketers
Cricketers from Melbourne